Don Rader may refer to:

 Don Rader (musician) (born 1935), American jazz trumpeter
 Don Rader (baseball) (1893–1983), Major League Baseball shortstop